Maya Cousineau Mollen (born 1975) is an Innu poet from Mingan, Quebec, Canada. She is most noted for her poetry collection Enfants du lichen, which was the winner of the Governor General's Award for French-language poetry at the 2022 Governor General's Awards.

Her debut poetry collection, Bréviaire du matricule 082, was published in 2019, and was the winner of the Indigenous Voices Award for French-language poetry in 2020.

References

1975 births
Living people
21st-century Canadian poets
21st-century Canadian women writers
21st-century First Nations writers
Canadian poets in French
Canadian women poets
First Nations poets
Governor General's Award-winning poets
Innu people
Writers from Quebec
People from Côte-Nord